Eremurus stenophyllus, the narrow-leaved foxtail lily, is a species of flowering plant in the family Asphodelaceae, native to central Asia. Racemes composed of small yellow flowers appear in summer. The flowers darken to brown from the base, forming a two-tone effect.with age.

The  specific epithet stenophyllus is derived from the Greek stenos (narrow) and phyllon (leaf) to give “with narrow leaves”.

This plant is grown as a garden perennial for a sunny border, and has gained the Royal Horticultural Society’s Award of Garden Merit.

Two subspecies are listed, E. stenophyllus subsp. ambigens, and E. stenophyllus subsp. aurantiacus.

References

Asphodeloideae
Taxa named by John Gilbert Baker
Taxa named by Friedrich Alexander Buhse
Taxa named by Pierre Edmond Boissier